Dendropsophus mapinguari, the Mapinguari clown tree frog, is a frog in the family Hylidae.  It is endemic to Brazil.

References

mapinguari
Amphibians described in 2016
Amphibians of Brazil
Endemic fauna of Brazil